= Murphy (board game) =

1989 board game

Murphy is a board game published in 1989 by Flying Turtle Games.

== Contents ==
Murphy is a game in which the board contains a map of southeast Asia with seven cities marked.

== Reception ==
Theo Clarke reviewed Murphy for Games International magazine, and gave it a rating of 8 out of 10, and stated that "The Flying Turtles can justly be proud of this game and I hope that it catches on in the UK."
